The Bate Collection of Musical Instruments is a collection of historic musical instruments, mainly for Western classical music, from the Middle Ages onwards. It is housed in Oxford University's Faculty of Music near Christ Church on St. Aldate's.

The collection is open to the public and is available for academic study by appointment. The current curator (as of November 2017) is Andy Lamb, a former NCO who served in the Royal Artillery and was a trumpeter in their Junior Leaders band during his training as a Boy Soldier.  There are frequent gallery events and special exhibitions. More than a thousand instruments by important English, French and German makers, are on display, showing the musical and mechanical development of wind and percussion instruments from the Renaissance to the current day.

The Bate Collection is additionally the home of the Reginald Morley-Pegge Memorial Collection of Horns and other Brass and Woodwind Instruments; the Anthony Baines Collection; the Edgar Hunt Collection of Recorders and other instruments; the Jean Henry Collection, the Taphouse Keyboard Loans; the Roger Warner Keyboard Collection; the Michael Thomas Keyboard Collection; a number of instruments from the Jeremy Montagu Collection; a complete workshop of the English bow-maker William C Retford, as well as a small collection of Bows formed in his memory, the Wally Horwood Collection of books and recordings, and other instruments acquired by purchase and gift.
An album, 'Voices From The Past, Vol. 2: Instruments of The Bate Collection' was released in 2015.

History 
The collection is named after Philip Bate who began giving his collection of musical instruments to the University of Oxford in 1963, on the condition that it was used for teaching and was provided with a specialist curator to care for and lecture on it. The collection also houses an archive of his papers.

See also 
 List of music museums
 Museum of Oxford

References

External links

Bate Collection website
Collection catalog

1968 establishments in England
Museums established in 1968
Music museums in England
Museums of the University of Oxford
Archives in Oxfordshire

Musical instrument museums in England